Kim So-yeon (born October 6, 1995), known by the stage name Kassy (케이시), is a South Korean singer-songwriter. Since her debut in 2015, she has released five extended plays and numerous singles.

In 2016 she competed on the survival reality show Unpretty Rapstar 3.

Discography

Extended plays

Single albums

Singles

Soundtrack appearances

Other charted songs

Filmography

Television

Web

Awards and nominations

References

1995 births
Living people
South Korean women pop singers
Unpretty Rapstar contestants